The 8th Mountain Division was formed on 27 February 1945 by the redesignation of the 157th Mountain Division, which itself had been formed from the 157th Infantry Division in September 1944, and which had participated in operations against the maquis of Vercors. The division was stationed in France until the Italian surrender when it then moved to Italy taking 5,772 prisoners in two days during the disarmament of the Italian Army. The division remained in Italy for the rest of the war and surrendered to the Americans in April, 1945.

Commander
Generalleutnant Paul Schricker

Order of battle
Gebirgsjäger Regiment 296
3 x Battalions
Gebirgsjäger Regiment 297
3 x Battalions
Gebirgs Artillery Regiment 1057
Feldersatz Battalion 1057
Panzerjäger Battalion 157
Reconnaissance Battalion 1057
Gebirgs Pionier Battalion 1057
Gebirgs Signals Battalion 1057
Division Supply troop 1057

References

Further reading
James Lucas - Hitler's Mountain Troops: Fighting at the extremes
Veit Scherzer - 8. Gebirgs-Division
Gordon Williamson - German Mountain & Ski Troops 1939-45

8
Military units and formations established in 1945
Military units and formations disestablished in 1945